American Near East Refugee Aid (Anera) is an American 501(c)(3) non-governmental organization that provides humanitarian and development aid to the Middle East, specifically the West Bank, the Gaza Strip, Lebanon and Jordan. Founded in 1968 in the aftermath of the Six-Day War, Anera initially sought to help the hundreds of thousands of displaced Palestinians by providing emergency relief. While still providing crisis response, Anera now also addresses the long-term economic and social needs of Palestinians, Lebanese and Jordanians through its health care, education and job creation programs. By helping people meet their fundamental needs, Anera understands its work as an essential component to peace in the Middle East and restoring dignity to the people.

The largest American NGO operating in the West Bank and Gaza, Anera works closely with local institutions, such as schools, universities, health facilities, cooperatives, municipalities, grassroots communities, and charitable associations to improve the community services they provide. Anera is funded by individual donors and grants from public and private institutions. Anera has received the highest rating (4 stars) by Charity Navigator, an independent evaluator of charities' fiscal management, and meets all twenty of the Better Business Bureau standards for charity accountability.

Programs
Through its programs that alleviate suffering and reduce poverty—the "beginning and end points on a continuum of human need"—Anera works to help people meet their fundamental necessities. Through both large-scale projects like building reservoirs and smaller projects like installing water tanks on the tops of homes, Anera has many programs that meet people's immediate needs and provide jobs at the same time. Anera has been praised for its transparency and dedication to improving the lives of impoverished communities in the Middle East. In 2011, Anera provided more than $65 million worth of programs to the people of the West Bank, Gaza, Lebanon and Jordan.

Health and relief
Anera has delivered emergency relief and medical supplies to communities in the Middle East. Anera has built 177 water cisterns and is building or repairing water networks and pipelines in the West Bank and Gaza.

Education
Anera helps to build new schools, offer after-school programs, train preschool teachers and principals, teach information technology, and support music education. During fiscal year 2007, Anera expanded its Gaza-based preschool teacher-training project to provide employment opportunities for skilled women while developing organizational skills, active learning techniques and communications skills among children and increasing parent and community involvement in the educational process.

Community and economic development
Anera offers community assistance in the form of infrastructure projects and job training programs to help people become entrepreneurs with access to small business loans and job opportunities. During fiscal year 2007, Anera's Emergency Water and Sanitation Project received nearly $4 million in grants from the U.S. Agency for International Development to respond to emergency water and sanitation needs in the West Bank and Gaza, and create short-term employment opportunities for impoverished and outlying Palestinian communities.

Anera's sponsors children between the ages of 4 and 17 to receive an education in one of seven schools in Lebanon, Gaza or the West Bank. Students who participate in the scholarship program are orphans, come from impoverished households or are in need of physical and rehabilitative support, and might not otherwise have opportunities to receive a regular education.

Sarra water project
In February 2008, Anera partnered with the United States Agency for International Development (USAID) in a project to install an internal water network in the village of Sarra in the West Bank. According to the USAID press release, the project "will ensure access to a reliable water supply ... [and will be] funded by USAID and implemented by Anera. The total cost of the project is $255,000 and is anticipated to generate 1,800 days of employment."

References

External links
 Official Website

Non-governmental organizations involved in the Israeli–Palestinian conflict
Charities based in Washington, D.C.
Development charities based in the United States
Foreign charities operating in the State of Palestine
501(c)(3) organizations